Guglielmo Zuelli (October 20, 1859 – October 17, 1941) was an Italian composer and conductor.

Zuelli was born at Reggio Emilia. He wrote two operas, one of which was performed; some sacred choral works; and a handful of orchestral pieces. He died aged 81 in Milan.

References

1859 births
1941 deaths
Italian composers
Italian male composers
Italian conductors (music)
Italian male conductors (music)
People from Reggio Emilia